Shiela Mehra is an Indian gynaecologist, Obstetrician and a director of the department of Gynaecology and Obstetrics at Moolchand Hospital, New Delhi. A 1959 graduate of the Lady Hardinge Medical College, she secured the degrees of DRCOG and MRCOG from the Royal College of Obstetricians and Gynaecologists, UK. She is a Fellow of the Indian College of Obstetricians and Gynaecologists (ICOG) and a recipient of awards such as the Radha Raman Award (1998) and Life Time Achievement Award of the Indian Medical Association (2006). The Government of India awarded her the fourth highest civilian award of the Padma Shri, in 1991.

References

Recipients of the Padma Shri in medicine
Indian gynaecologists
Indian women gynaecologists
20th-century Indian women scientists
Indian obstetricians
Fellows of the Royal College of Obstetricians and Gynaecologists
20th-century Indian medical doctors
Living people
Medical doctors from Delhi
Women scientists from Delhi
20th-century women physicians
Year of birth missing (living people)